Dorinel Ionel Munteanu (born 25 June 1968) is a Romanian retired professional footballer and manager.

A former midfielder, Munteanu is the most capped Romanian player of all time, with a total of 134 appearances and 16 goals. He played in two editions of the World Cup, those held in the United States in 1994 and France in 1998, as well as two European Championships, in 1996 and 2000.

Club career
Munteanu was born in Grădinari. He started his football career playing for Metalul Bocșa, a team which offered him the first chance to play in Divizia B in 1986. After a year he went to play for FCM Reșița and then in 1988 for Olt Scornicești, while 1989 found him at Inter Sibiu.

Dinamo Bucharest bought him from FC Inter Sibiu in 1991 only to sell him to Cercle Brugge two years later. After two years in Belgium, he moved to Germany to play for 1. FC Köln and VfL Wolfsburg until 2003.

In 2003, aged 35, he was released from his contract by VfL Wolfsburg and signed with Steaua București as a free agent, only to leave the club in 2005 after a conflict with the club's Chief Executive Mihai Stoica and join the squad of CFR Cluj Napoca.

International career
Dorinel won his first cap for Romania in 1991 while still at Inter Sibiu. Since then he was a very important part of the national team of Romania, playing in various positions such as left back, left midfielder and playmaker.

In 2001, he won his 100th cap in a game against Slovenia in Ljubljana and four years later he won the 126th cap, making him the most capped Romanian footballer. He has a total of 134 caps.

Munteanu scored 16 goals for Romania and played at the 1994 FIFA World Cup, UEFA Euro 1996, 1998 FIFA World Cup and UEFA Euro 2000.

Coaching career
After leaving Steaua București, Munteanu is offered the position of player-manager at CFR Cluj. In this first managerial job, he took the team to the Intertoto Cup final in 2005 and finished fifth in Divizia A at the end of the 2005–06 season. During the first half of the 2006–07 season, despite a good start (six wins, two draws, two defeats) with CFR Cluj, Munteanu announced he resigns his position at the club, due to interference with his decisions and lack of support from the club management. Munteanu had a pending offer from Argeș Pitești and he decided to accept it, despite the team being bottom of the first league after 10 games. Towards the end of the season, due to impossibility of avoiding the relegation of Argeș Pitești, he was sacked, only to be confirmed in short time as the new manager of Liga 1 team FC Vaslui. He has stated that he also intends to continue his playing career at FC Vaslui. He came back as head coach of Universitatea Cluj in September 2008, but only after seven games he quit to go to Steaua București. And again, after only eight games, he was dismissed by the club's president, Gigi Becali and returned to Universitatea Cluj.

After the short spell at Universitatea Cluj, in July 2009 he signed a contract with Oțelul Galați. In the first season under his command, the team finished eighth. The next season, Oțelul started the season with four wins in the first six games and climbed on top of the championship. They finished first the Autumn part of the season, and what seemed to be only a flash in the pan, became one of the biggest surprises in the Romanian football. Oțelul maintained its position throughout the Spring season and became Romanian champion for the first time in their history. Munteanu was seen as the primary factor for this success.

The following season, under Munteanu's guidance, Oțelul took part in the UEFA Champions League group stage, but failed to gain a single point. In the championship, Oțelul finished sixth and didn't qualify for the European competitions.

The 2012–13 season started badly for Oțelul who won the game in the first round, against Politehnica Iași, but then registered five consecutive games without a win. As a consequence, Dorinel Munteanu resigned.

In November 2012, he was installed as a head coach at Dinamo București. After only one month and four games in charge at Dinamo, Munteanu resigned at the end of 2012, citing the wish to follow his dream to coach abroad. Just a day later, on 28 December 2012, Munteanu signed a contract for one and a half years with Mordovia Saransk.
On 1 August 2013, he took charge of Russian side Kuban Krasnodar, before being sacked on 12 October of the same year.
On 14 June 2014, Munteanu was appointed as manager of Gabala FK. Munteanu was relieved of his duties as manager on 8 December 2014, following four wins in sixteen matches.

Career statistics

International goals
Scores and results list Romania's goal tally first, score column indicates score after each Munteanu goal.

Managerial statistics

Honours

Player
Inter Sibiu
Balkans Cup: 1990–91
Dinamo București
Divizia A: 1991–92
FCSB
Divizia A: 2004–05
CFR Cluj
UEFA Intertoto Cup runner-up: 2005

Individual 

 Man of the Season (Belgian First Division): 1993–94

Coach
CFR Cluj
UEFA Intertoto Cup runner-up: 2005
Oțelul Galați
Liga I: 2010–11
Supercupa României: 2011
Liga III: 2021–22

See also
List of men's footballers with 100 or more international caps

References

External links

 
 

1968 births
People from Caraș-Severin County
Living people
Romanian footballers
Association football midfielders
CSM Reșița players
FC Olt Scornicești players
FC Inter Sibiu players
FC Dinamo București players
Cercle Brugge K.S.V. players
1. FC Köln players
VfL Wolfsburg players
FC Steaua București players
CFR Cluj players
FC Argeș Pitești players
FC Vaslui players
FC Universitatea Cluj players
Liga I players
Belgian Pro League players
Bundesliga players
2. Bundesliga players
Romanian expatriate footballers
Expatriate footballers in Belgium
Expatriate footballers in Germany
Romanian expatriate sportspeople in Belgium
Romanian expatriate sportspeople in Germany
Romania under-21 international footballers
Romania international footballers
UEFA Euro 1996 players
UEFA Euro 2000 players
1994 FIFA World Cup players
1998 FIFA World Cup players
FIFA Century Club
Player-coaches
Romanian football managers
Romanian expatriate football managers
FC Argeș Pitești managers
FC Universitatea Cluj managers
CFR Cluj managers
FC Vaslui managers
FC Steaua București managers
ASC Oțelul Galați managers
FC Dinamo București managers
FC Mordovia Saransk managers
FC Kuban Krasnodar managers
Gabala FC managers
FC Astra Giurgiu managers
CS Concordia Chiajna managers
CSM Reșița managers
Russian Premier League managers
Expatriate football managers in Russia
Romanian expatriate sportspeople in Russia
Romanian expatriate sportspeople in Iraq
Expatriate football managers in Iraq
People's Movement Party politicians